Skarin may refer to:

 Annalee Skarin (1899–1988), American author
 Skarin, a character in the video game Viking: Battle for Asgard